San Marino competed at the 2015 European Games, in Baku, Azerbaijan from 12 to 28 June 2015.

It was announced that San Marino would be entering 18 athletes, to compete in the games.

Medalists

Archery

Athletics

Men

Women

Judo

Women

Shooting

Men

Women

Mixed

Swimming
 

Women

Table tennis

Taekwondo

References

Nations at the 2015 European Games
European Games
2015